Charles Gore Hay, 20th Earl of Erroll, KT, CB (7 February 1852 – 8 July 1927), styled Lord Hay until 1891, was a Scottish soldier and Conservative politician.

Early life
Hay was the eldest surviving son of eight children born to Eliza Amelia Gore and William Harry Hay, 19th Earl of Erroll.

His paternal grandparents were William Hay, 18th Earl of Erroll and Elizabeth Hay, Countess of Erroll (the illegitimate daughter of William IV by his mistress Dorothea Jordan). His maternal grandfather was General the Hon. Sir Charles Stephen Gore, KH, GCB, a Waterloo officer (who was a son of the 2nd Earl of Arran and brother to the Duchess of Inverness).

Career
Lord Hay was commissioned a second lieutenant in the Royal Horse Guards on 7 July 1869. He was promoted to lieutenant on 19 August 1871, to captain on 11 September 1875, to major on 1 July 1881, to lieutenant-colonel on 24 September 1887, and to colonel on 18 January 1895.

Following the outbreak of the Second Boer War in late 1899, he volunteered for active service and was commissioned in the Imperial Yeomanry. He took part in the Battle of Paardeberg (February 1900), following which he was in charge of prisoners from Piet Cronjé's army. In early March 1900 he took command of a yeomanry brigade in the South Africa Field Force, with the rank of brigadier general. The following year he was in June 1901 appointed Assistant Adjutant-General. He was later an Honorary Major-General in the British Army and a Lieutenant-Colonel commanding the Royal Horse Guards. He went on to serve as General Officer Commanding 65th (2nd Lowland) Division between 1915 and 1916.

Peerage and political career
He succeeded his father in the earldom in 1891. Lord Erroll served in the Conservative administration of Arthur Balfour as a Lord-in-waiting (government whip in the House of Lords) from 1903 to 1905. In 1901 he was made a Knight of the Thistle.

Personal life
In 1875, he was married to Mary Caroline L'Estrange, daughter of Edmund L'Estrange by his wife Harriet Susan Beresford Lumley-Savile (sister of Richard Lumley, 9th Earl of Scarbrough, and daughter of Frederick Lumley-Savile and of Charlotte De la Poer-Beresford, a daughter of George de la Poer Beresford, Bishop of Kilmore). Together, they were the parents of three sons:

 Victor Alexander Sereld Hay, 21st Earl of Erroll (1876–1928), who married Mary Lucy Victoria, only daughter of Sir Allan Mackenzie, 2nd Baronet, in 1900.
 Cmdr. Hon. Sereld Mordaunt Alan Josslyn Hay (1877–1939), who married Violet Spiller, second daughter of Lt.-Col. Duncan Chisholm Oliver Spiller, in 1915.
 Capt. Hon. Ivan Josslyn Lumley Hay (1884–1936), a Page of Honour who married Pamela Burroughes, a daughter of Francis George Burroughes of Blakeney Holt, in 1921.

He died in July 1927, aged 75, and was succeeded in the earldom by his eldest son Victor, who held the title for less than a year before his death on 20 February 1928 when he was succeeded by his eldest son, Josslyn. Lady Erroll died in 1934.

Descendants
Through his eldest son, and heir, Victor, he was a grandfather of Josslyn Hay, 22nd Earl of Erroll (who married Lady Myra Sackville, daughter of the Earl De La Warr), Gilbert Boyd, 6th Baron Kilmarnock (who married firstly The Hon. Rosemary Guest, daughter of Viscount Wimborne), and Lady Rosemary Hay, who (married Lt.-Col. Rupert Ryan and, secondly Major James Gresham).

References

External links

|-

1852 births
1927 deaths
20
British Army major generals
British Yeomanry officers
British Army personnel of the Second Boer War
Companions of the Order of the Bath
Conservative Party (UK) Baronesses- and Lords-in-Waiting
Knights of the Thistle
British Army generals of World War I